The 2019 Houston Cougars football team represented the University of Houston in the 2019 NCAA Division I FBS football season. The Cougars played their home games at TDECU Stadium in Houston, Texas, and competed in the West Division of the American Athletic Conference. They were led by first-year head coach Dana Holgorsen. They finished the season 4–8, 2–6 in AAC play to finish in a tie for fifth-place in the West Division.

Previous season
The Cougars finished the 2018 season 8–5, 5–3 in AAC play to finish in a three-way tie for the West Division championship. After tiebreakers, they did not represent the West Division in the AAC Championship Game. They were invited to the Armed Forces Bowl where they lost to Army by a score of 14–70, in the process tying records for the most points given up (70) and the largest margin-of-loss (56) in NCAA bowl game history. On December 30, Houston fired Major Applewhite after two seasons.

Preseason

AAC media poll
The AAC media poll was released on July 16, 2019, with the Cougars predicted to finish second in the AAC West Division.

Preseason All-AAC teams
Houston placed six players to the All-AAC team, sanctioned by Athlon Sports.

Offense

1st team

D'Eriq King – SR, Quarterback

2nd team

Marquez Stevenson – SR, Wide receiver
Josh Jones – SR, Offensive lineman
Jarrid Williams – GR, Offensive lineman

Defensive

2nd team

Isaiah Chambers – JR, Defensive lineman
Gleson Sprewell – JR, Safety

Award watch lists
Listed in the order that they were released

References:

Roster

Schedule

Schedule Source:

Game summaries

at Oklahoma

Prairie View A&M

vs. Washington State

at Tulane

at North Texas

Cincinnati

at UConn

SMU

at UCF

Memphis

at Tulsa

Navy

Players drafted into the NFL

References

Houston
Houston Cougars football seasons
Houston Cougars football